Xerodes is a genus of moths in the family Geometridae first described by Achille Guenée in 1857.

Species
Xerodes albisparsa (Warren, 1896)
Xerodes albonotaria (Bremer, 1864)
Xerodes cinerosa (Warren, 1895)
Xerodes contiguaria (Leech, 1897)
Xerodes crenulata (Wileman, 1915)
Xerodes inaccepta (Prout, 1910)
Xerodes lignicolor (Warren, 1897)
Xerodes pilosa Holloway, 1994
Xerodes rufescentaria (Motschoulsky, 1861)
Xerodes sordidata (Inoue, 1987)
Xerodes ypsaria Guenée, 1857

Distribution
China.

References

Ennominae